Caswell is a surname. Notable people with the surname include:

Albert Edward Caswell (1884–1954), American physicist and educator
Alexis Caswell (1799–1877), American mathematician, scientist and educator
Allan Caswell (born 1952), Australian songwriter
Berengera Caswell (1828–1849), Canadian mill and factory worker 
Bill Caswell, American country music singer, songwriter and musician
Brian Caswell (born 1954), Australian author
Brian Caswell (footballer) (born 1956), English footballer
Bruce Caswell (born 1949), American politician
Burr Caswell (1807–1896), American frontiersman
Eddie Caswell, Welsh rugby player in the 1920s and coach in the 1930s and 1940s
Emil George Henry Caswell (1854–?), Anglican clergyman
Gay Caswell (born 1948), Canadian writer and politician
G. N. Caswell (1818 cricketer), English cricketer
Hollis Caswell (1901–1988), American educator
John Caswell (1654 or 1655–1712), English mathematician and Oxford professor of astronomy
Lucien B. Caswell (1827–1919), American politician
Luke Caswell, better known as Cazwell, a gay American rapper
Oliver A. Caswell, member of the Wisconsin State Assembly in 1872
Peter Caswell (born 1957), English football goalkeeper
Richard Caswell (1729–1789), first and fifth governor of North Carolina
Robert Caswell (1946–2006), Australian screenwriter
Samuel Bradford Caswell (1828–1898), American mining engineer, judge and Los Angeles government official
William E. Caswell (1947–2001), American physicist